Clavatula smithi is a species of sea snail, a marine gastropod mollusk in the family Clavatulidae.

Description

Distribution
This species occurs in the Atlantic Ocean off West Africa.

References

 Knudsen, J. "Marine prosobranchs of tropical West Africa collected by the Atlantide Expedition, 1945-46." Videnskabelige Meddelelser fra Dansk naturhistorisk Forening I Kjobenhavn 114 (1952): 129–185.
 Nolf F. (2011), Rehabilitation of Clavatula smithi Knudsen, 1952 (Mollusca: Gastropoda: Clavatulidae), Neptunea 10 (2)

smithi
Gastropods described in 1952